The 2002 Tour de Corse (formally the 46th Tour de Corse - Rallye de France) was the third round of the 2002 World Rally Championship. The race was held over three days between 8 March and 10 March 2002, and was won by Peugeot's Gilles Panizzi, his 4th win in the World Rally Championship.

Background

Entry list

Itinerary
All dates and times are CET (UTC+1).

Results

Overall

World Rally Cars

Classification

Special stages

Championship standings

Production World Rally Championship

Classification

Special stages

Championship standings

References

External links 
 Official website of the World Rally Championship

Tour de Corse
Tour de Corse